An Isolated Danger Mark, as defined by the International Association of Lighthouse Authorities, is a sea mark used in maritime pilotage to indicate a hazard to shipping such as a partially submerged rock.

It is recognisable by its black and red bands and top-mark of two black balls.

Its distinctive sequence of flashing white light consists of 2 quick flashes in intervals of either 5 or 10 seconds.

See also

 Navigation
 Lateral mark
 Cardinal mark
 Safe water mark
 Special mark
 Emergency wreck buoy

Footnotes

References

Buoyage